Falling Cycle was a Christian metal/Christian hardcore band from Riverside, California. They have been compared to Darkest Hour and No Innocent Victim. Guitarist Sean Durham joined Sinai Beach soon after the band broke-up.

Musical Style
The band originally played Hardcore punk, but mainly played Metalcore and Death metal. Along with elements on Speed metal, Grind metal, and Melodic death metal.

Members
Last known line-up
 Mike Shook - vocals
 Sean Durham - guitar (now in Sinai Beach)
 Russ Long - guitar, backing vocals
 Kevin Bleitz - drums

Former
 Holden Caulfield - bass
 Russell Murray - guitar
 Sean Taylor - guitar
 Mike Chase - vocals

Discography
 The Conflict (2002; Facedown)

References

Facedown Records artists
Musical groups established in 1999
Musical groups disestablished in 2002
1999 establishments in California